Wayland Eugene Nelson II (born December 3, 1960), is a former professional baseball player who pitched in the Major Leagues from 1981 to 1993. After beginning his career as a starting pitcher with the New York Yankees and Seattle Mariners, Nelson gradually converted to a relief role starting in 1983. He was a key member of the ace relief staff that helped propel the Oakland Athletics to three pennant-winning seasons from 1988 to 1990, frequently setting up Dennis Eckersley for his saves. Nelson posted a 1.57 ERA in 1990 and earned a 9-6 record in 1988. After seeing his performance slip in 1991 and 1992, he closed out his career in 1993 with a 3.12 ERA while pitching for the California Angels and Texas Rangers.

External links

1960 births
Living people
Major League Baseball pitchers
Baseball players from Tampa, Florida
New York Yankees players
Seattle Mariners players
Chicago White Sox players
Oakland Athletics players
California Angels players
Texas Rangers players
Gulf Coast Rangers players
Fort Lauderdale Yankees players
Asheville Tourists players
Columbus Clippers players
Salt Lake City Gulls players
Pasco High School (Florida) alumni